Dariusz Pietrasiak (born February 12, 1980 in Sandomierz) is a  retired Polish footballer (defender).

Career

Club
He also played for KSZO Ostrowiec Świętokrzyski and GKS Bełchatów.

In June 2010, he joined Polonia Warszawa on a three-year contract. He was released one year later.

In June 2011, he moved to Śląsk Wrocław on a two-year contract.

After a one-year spell with Śląsk, In July 2012, he agreed to terms with Israeli Premier League side Maccabi Netanya on a one-year contract. He only made a few non-league appearances and was released from Netanya on 27 August.

International
He has been capped by Poland twice, in games against Australia and United States.

Achievements
 Ekstraklasa:
Winner (1): 2011–12
Runner-up (1): 2006-07
 Ekstraklasa Cup:
Runner-up (1): 2007
Polish SuperCup:
Runner-up (1): 2007

References

External links

 
 

1980 births
Living people
Polish footballers
Poland international footballers
Association football defenders
GKS Bełchatów players
KSZO Ostrowiec Świętokrzyski players
Polonia Warsaw players
Śląsk Wrocław players
Podbeskidzie Bielsko-Biała players
Ekstraklasa players
Maccabi Netanya F.C. players
Polish expatriate footballers
Expatriate footballers in Israel
Polish expatriate sportspeople in Israel
People from Sandomierz
Sportspeople from Świętokrzyskie Voivodeship